Dušan Tanasković (born February 23, 2001) is a Serbian professional basketball player for Igokea of the ABA League.

Professional career 
Tanasković began his basketball career at the youth system with Partizan Belgrade. Prior to the 2018–19 season, Tanasković was loaned out to Mladost Zemun as a two-way affiliate player, making him available for the senior roster of Partizan. On December 22, 2018, Tanasković made his Adriatic League debut with Partizan in a home win over Cedevita, making no records in under 3 minutes of playing time. On February 5, 2019, at age 17, he debuted in the EuroCup in a loss to Alba Berlin, recording 6 points and 2 rebounds in under 11 minutes of playing time. On February 28, Tanasković signed his first professional contract for Partizan. Through 20 games in the 2018–19 Serbian First League with Mladost Zemun, Tanasković averaged 8.2 points, 6 rebounds, and 1.6 blocks in 22 minutes per game.

In June 2022, Tanasković signed a 3-year contract with Igokea of the ABA League, joining his brother's team.

National team career
Tanasković was a member of the Serbian under-16 national team that won the bronze medal at the 2017 FIBA Europe Under-16 Championship in Montenegro. Over seven tournament games, he averaged 4.3 points, 4.4 rebounds and 0.6 assists per game. He was a member of the Serbian under-17 team that participated at the 2018 FIBA Under-17 Basketball World Cup in Argentina. Over three tournament games, he averaged 9.4 points, 5.3 rebounds and 1.3 blocks per game.

Personal life 
His older brother Nikola is a basketball player.

References

External links 
 Profile at realgm.com
 Profile at euroleague.net
 Profile at aba-liga.com

2001 births
Living people
ABA League players
Basketball League of Serbia players
Centers (basketball)
OKK Dunav players
KK Mladost Zemun players
KK Partizan players
People from Smederevska Palanka
Power forwards (basketball)
Serbian men's basketball players